Alessandro Bazzana (born 16 July 1984 in Alzano Lombardo) is an Italian former professional cyclist.

Major results

2005
 3rd Trofeo Banca Popolare di Vicenza
2006
 6th Trofeo Banca Popolare di Vicenza
2008
 7th Overall Rochester Omnium
 8th Tour de Leelanau
2009
 9th US Air Force Cycling Classic
2011
 10th Tour de Mumbai II
2012
 Tour of Austria
1st  Points classification
1st Stage 1
 7th Paris–Brussels
 9th Grand Prix de Fourmies
2013
 6th Le Samyn
2014
 4th Dwars door Drenthe
 4th Bucks County Classic
 6th Roma Maxima
 7th Volta Limburg Classic
2015
 1st  Sprints classification Abu Dhabi Tour
 5th Overall World Ports Classic
 6th Overall Dubai Tour
1st  Sprints classification
 8th Ronde van Drenthe

References

External links

1984 births
Living people
Italian male cyclists
People from Alzano Lombardo
Cyclists from the Province of Bergamo